This article presents the discography of the French pop singer Étienne Daho.

Albums

Studio albums

1 EP, charted in the singles charts, sometimes under the title "Jungle Pulse"

Live albums

Compilations

Extended plays

Singles

*Did not appear in the official Belgian Ultratop 50 charts, but rather in the bubbling under Ultratip charts.

All singles (including non-charting)

1981
 "Il ne dira pas"
1982
 "Le Grand Sommeil"
1983
 "Sortir ce soir"
1984
 "Week-end à Rome"
1985
 "Tombé pour la France"
1986
 "Épaule tatoo"
 "Duel au soleil"
1988
 "Bleu comme toi"
 "Des heures hindoues"
1989
 "Caribbean sea"
 "Stay with me"
 "Le Grand Sommeil" (live)
1990
 "Le Plaisir de perdre" (live)
1991
 "Saudade"

1992
 "Des attractions désastre"
 "Les Voyages immobiles"
1993
 "Comme un igloo"
 "Un homme à la mer"
 "Mon manège à moi"
1995
 "Jungle Pulse"
 "Tous les goûts sont dans ma nature" (with Jacques Dutronc)
1996
 "He's on the Phone"
 "Au commencement"
 "A New World"
1997
 "Me manquer"
 "Soudain"
 "Les Bords de Seine"
1998
 "Le Premier Jour"
 "Idéal"
1999
 "Sur mon cou" (live)

2000
 "Le Brasier"
 "La Nage indienne"
 "Rendez-vous à Vedra"
2001
 "Ouverture"
 "Comme un boomerang" (with Dani)
2003
 "Retour à toi"
2004
 "If" (with Charlotte Gainsbourg)
 "Réévolution"
2005
 "Sortir ce soir"
2007
 "L'Invitation"
2008
 "Obsession"
 "La vie continuera"
 "L'adorer"
2013
 "Les chansons de l'innocence"
 "Le peau dure"
2014
 "En surface" / "En surface (Rone Remix)"
2016
 "Paris sens interdits"
2017
 "Les flocons de l'été"

References

 Étienne Daho's discography and peak positions

Daho, Etienne
Pop music discographies